Abílio Antônio Gonçalves Brandão was a Portuguese sports shooter. He competed in the 50 m rifle event at the 1948 Summer Olympics.

References

External links
 

Year of birth missing
Possibly living people
Portuguese male sport shooters
Olympic shooters of Portugal
Shooters at the 1948 Summer Olympics
Place of birth missing